Brexit is the withdrawal of the United Kingdom from the European Union.

Brexit may also refer to:
 Brexit (Banksy), a piece of artwork by Banksy
 Brexit (cat), a joke by Nathalie Loiseau
 Brebes Exit, a toll road exit in Indonesia known for the 2016 deadly traffic jam
 Brexit: The Movie, a 2016 documentary film
 Brexit: The Uncivil War, a 2019 television film
 Brexit Party, a Eurosceptic political party in the United Kingdom

See also
 Danexit
 Frexit
 Grexit
 Huxit
 Nexit
 Roexit